Charles Meldrum Daniels (March 24, 1885 – August 9, 1973) was an American competition swimmer, eight-time Olympic medalist, and world record-holder in two freestyle swimming events.  Daniels was an innovator of the front crawl swimming style, inventing the "American crawl".

Daniels began his swimming career with the New York Athletic Club in 1903.  At the 1904 Olympics in St. Louis, Missouri, Daniels became the first American to win an Olympic medal, winning gold medals in both the 220- and 440-yard freestyle races. Four years later, at the 1908 Olympics in London, Daniels won gold in the 100-meter freestyle.

Daniels was inducted into the International Swimming Hall of Fame as an "Honor Swimmer" in 1965.

See also
 List of members of the International Swimming Hall of Fame
 List of multiple Olympic gold medalists
 List of multiple Olympic gold medalists at a single Games
 List of multiple Olympic medalists at a single Games
 World record progression 100 metres freestyle
 World record progression 200 metres freestyle

References

External links

 
 "Eight Swimming Marks for Daniels", New York Times, January 1, 1911

1885 births
1973 deaths
American male freestyle swimmers
Olympic bronze medalists for the United States in swimming
Olympic gold medalists for the United States in swimming
Olympic silver medalists for the United States in swimming
Sportspeople from Dayton, Ohio
Swimmers at the 1904 Summer Olympics
Swimmers at the 1908 Summer Olympics
Swimmers at the 1906 Intercalated Games
Medalists at the 1908 Summer Olympics
Medalists at the 1904 Summer Olympics
Medalists at the 1906 Intercalated Games